= Kwok Kee Chan =

Kwok Kee Chan from the Chan Technologies Inc., Brampton, Ontario, Canada, was named Fellow of the Institute of Electrical and Electronics Engineers (IEEE) in 2013 for development of planar lens beamforming networks and broadband antennas.
